Lyngdalen is a valley in Agder county, Norway. The valley follows the river Lygna from the mountain plateaus in northern Hægebostad to the Lyngdalsfjorden, just south of the town of Lyngdal. The villages of Kvås, Snartemo, and Tingvatn are all located in the valley. The long, narrow lake Lygne is also located in the valley.

References

Lyngdal
Valleys of Agder